This article lists the confirmed squads for the 2006 Women's Hockey World Cup tournament held in Madrid, Spain, between September 27 and October 8, 2006.

Pool A

China
Head Coach: Kim Chang-back

England
Head coach: Danny Kerry

Germany
Head coach: Markus Weise

India
Head coach: Maharaj Krishan Kaushik

Netherlands
Head coach: Marc Lammers

Spain
Head coach: Pablo Usoz

Pool B

Argentina
Head coach: Gabriel Minadeo

Australia
Head coach: Frank Murray

Japan
Head coach: Yoo Seung-Jin

Korea
Head coach: Huh Sang-youn

South Africa
Head coach: Jenny King

United States
Head coach: Lee Bodimeade

External links
Official squad lists

Squads
Women's Hockey World Cup squads